C.I.B. Files or Criminal Investigation Bureau Files (Traditional Chinese: 刑事情報科) is a TVB modern drama series broadcast in August 2006.

Cast

Viewership ratings

References

External links
TVB.com C.I.B. Files - Official Website 

TVB dramas
2006 Hong Kong television series debuts
2006 Hong Kong television series endings